Cesar Torque Podesta Airport  is an airport serving the city of Moquegua, capital of the Moquegua Region of Peru.

See also

Transport in Peru
List of airports in Peru

References

External links
OpenStreetMap - Moquegua
OurAirports - Moquegua
SkyVector - Moquegua

Airports in Peru
Buildings and structures in Moquegua Region